Mahaudiere is a settlement in Guadeloupe in the commune of Le Moule, on the island of Grande-Terre.  It is located to the north of La Goguette and to the west of Pressec and La Berthaudiere.

Populated places in Guadeloupe